Pietro Sermonti (born 25 October 1971) is an Italian stage, film and television actor.

Life and career 
Born  in Rome, Sermonti is the son of writer  of Tuscan and Sicilian descent, and businesswoman Samaritana Rattazzi from Piedmont, a daughter of Susanna Agnelli. He was a promising footballer in the Juventus' youth team, but had to give up a professional career because of health problems. After graduating from Lycee Chateaubriand de Rome, he enrolled at several drama laboratories and  attended the Lee Strasberg Theatre Institute.

Sermonti made his professional debut on stage in Quer pasticciaccio brutto de via Merulana, directed by Luca Ronconi. He had his breakout in 2003, with the role of Guido Zanin in the TV-series Un medico in famiglia.

Selected filmography 
Tre mogli (2001)
Amore, bugie e calcetto (2008)
Un amore di strega (2009)
Boris: The Film (2011)
ReWined (2013)
I Can Quit Whenever I Want (2014)
Happily Mixed Up (2014)
Ever Been to the Moon? (2015)
I Can Quit Whenever I Want: Masterclass (2017)
I Can Quit Whenever I Want: Ad Honorem (2017)

References

External links 

 

1971 births
Agnelli family
20th-century Italian male actors
Italian male film actors
Italian male television actors
Italian male stage actors
Male actors from Rome
Living people